4-Fluoroestradiol (4-FE2) is a synthetic estrogen and a derivative of estradiol which was never marketed. It is specifically the 4-fluoro analogue of estradiol. 4-Fluoroestradiol has 180 ± 43% of the affinity of estradiol for the estrogen receptor of rat uterine cytosol and shows potent uterotrophic activity similar to that of estradiol in mice and rats. It has been labeled with fluorine-18 (18F) for potential use in medical imaging.

See also
 16α-Fluoroestradiol

References

Abandoned drugs
Secondary alcohols
Estranes
Fluoroarenes
Phenols
Synthetic estrogens